Walter Hudson (25 January 1852 – 18 March 1935) was a Labour Party politician in England.  He was Member of Parliament (MP) for Newcastle-upon-Tyne (UK Parliament constituency) from 1906 to 1918.

Hudson worked as a guard with the North Eastern Railway for twenty-five years, and joined the Amalgamated Society of Railway Servants (ASRS).  He served as president of the ASRS for eight years, and in 1899 served on the Royal Commission on Accidents to Railwaymen.

From 1898 to 1906, Hudson was the Irish Secretary of the ASRS, and in the role became active in the Irish Trades Union Congress (ITUC), serving as its president in 1903.  He was also active in the British Labour Party, and was elected as Member of Parliament for Newcastle-upon-Tyne at the 1906 United Kingdom general election.  He presided over the Labour Party's 1908 conference, and remained active in the ASRS and its successor, the National Union of Railwaymen (NUR), as chief of its movements department.

Hudson lost his Parliament seat at the 1918 United Kingdom general election, and retired completely in 1923.

References 

1852 births
1935 deaths
Amalgamated Society of Railway Servants-sponsored MPs
Labour Party (UK) MPs for English constituencies
Members of the Parliamentary Committee of the Trades Union Congress
UK MPs 1906–1910
UK MPs 1910
UK MPs 1910–1918
Chairs of the Labour Party (UK)